Gregory Woolley is a Canadian criminal associated with the Hells Angels motorcycle club. Woolley was the protege and bodyguard of Maurice Boucher, a controversial senior Hell Angels leader, who led his chapter in a long and extremely violent gang war against the Rock Machine, in Quebec, from 1994-2002.

In November 2015, Woolley and 47 suspected underworld leaders were arrested in a sweep. Police claim the sweep revealed Woolley was part of a conspiracy to murder another underworld figure, Raynald Desjardins.

Although the Hells Angels official policies are not racist, experts say many Hells Angels members are racist and it is rare for individuals of African ethnic heritage to join Hells Angels chapters. Woolley, whose ethnic background is Haitian, is described as a rare instance of an individual with African ethnic heritage to rise to a senior position in the Hells Angels. Prior to joining the Hells Angels Woolley's mentor was in a smaller motorcycle gang called the "SS", which had an explicit white supremacist ideology.

References

1972 births
Living people
Canadian gangsters
Canadian people of Haitian descent
Criminals from Montreal
Hells Angels